The Istituto Marangoni is a private Italian school of fashion and design. It is based in Milan, in Lombardy in northern Italy, and has branches in Florence, London and Paris, Shanghai and Shenzhen in China, Mumbai in India, and Miami in the United States.

History

The school was founded in Milan in 1935 by the tailor Giulio Marangoni, and became a Scuola Professionale Artistica or "professional art school" in 1942. At first the school trained mainly pattern makers and seamstresses; in the 1970s and 1980s it turned towards fashion design, product development and marketing.

A London branch was opened in a former textile factory at 30 Fashion Street, Spitalfields, in 2003, and a Paris branch opened in 2006. A branch in Via de' Tornabuoni in central Florence opened in 2016. In China, branches were opened in Shanghai in 2013, and in Shenzhen in 2016. The Group opened its first school in India, in Mumbai, in July 2017. 

In 2010 there were about 2200 students of 70 nationalities in three campuses.

In 2011 Career Education Corporation sold the Istituto Marangoni to Providence Equity Partners for a price estimated between 17 and 20 million dollars.

Accreditation

Since June 2016 the Istituto Marangoni has been listed by the Ministero dell'Istruzione, dell'Università e della Ricerca, the Italian ministry of education, among the institutions authorised to award degrees in music, dance and arts.

In the UK, its BA and MA programmes are validated by the Manchester Metropolitan University, which also awards master's degrees at the Paris branch. A three-year fashion stylist course in Paris is approved by the Commission nationale de la certification professionnelle.

Alumni

Alumni of the school include Franco Moschino, Domenico Dolce (who left after four months, believing that the school had nothing to teach him), Alessandra Facchinetti, Julie de Libran, Rahul Mishra, Rafael Lopez, Sandra Mansour, and Alessandro Sartori.

References

Higher education in Italy
Fashion schools
1935 establishments in Italy
Higher education in England
Higher education in France
Higher education in China
Universities and colleges in Milan
Educational institutions established in 1935
Italian fashion